Ghost of a Chance may refer to:

Music 
Ghost of a Chance (album), by Turboweekend, 2009
"Ghost of a Chance" (Rush song), 1992
"Ghost of a Chance", a song by The Blades
"Ghost of a Chance", a song by Garland Jeffreys from his 1981 LP Escape Artist

Television 
"Ghost of a Chance" (Homicide: Life on the Street), a 1993 episode of Homicide: Life on the Street
"Ghost of a Chance", an episode of Power Rangers Jungle Fury
"Pandamonium/Ghost of a Chance", episode of Iggy Arbuckle
"Ghost of a Chance", an episode of Garfield and Friends

Film 
 Ghost of a Chance (1968), a Children's Film Foundation short feature
 Ghost of a Chance (1987), an American comedy TV film starring Red Foxx and Dick van Dyke
 Ghost of a Chance (1998), an American TV film directed by Paul Haggis
 A Ghost of a Chance (2011), a Japanese comedy mystery film directed by Kōki Mitani

See also
Ghost of Chance, a novella by William S. Burroughs
"I Don't Stand a Ghost of a Chance with You", a 1932 song composed by Victor Young